Joan Barril i Cuixart (20 January 1952 – 13 December 2014) was a Catalan journalist and writer. He was born in Barcelona, Spain. He was known for his writing columns in El País, La Vanguardia and in El Periódico de Catalunya.

In 1998 he won the Ramon Llull Novel Award for Parada obligatòria.

Barril died in Barcelona from pneumonia, aged 62.

References

External links
 Web de El Cafè de la República  
 Web de opinión de El Periódico de Catalunya 
 Web del programa Qwerty 
 Entrevista a Joan Barril 
 Editorial Barril & Barral 

1952 births
2014 deaths
Deaths from pneumonia in Spain
Spanish journalists
People from Barcelona
Spanish columnists